is a hirayama-style Japanese castle located in the center of the city of Kaminoyama, eastern Yamagata Prefecture, Japan. Throughout the Edo period, Kaminoyama Castle was the headquarters for the daimyō of Kaminoyama Domain.

History 
The first castle on this site dates to the early Muromachi period, when the area was under the control of the Tendō clan.  The area was contested between the Mogami clan and the Date clan, changing hands several times. The foundations of the present castle were built by  Takenaga Yoshitada, a retainer of the Mogami, in 1535.  However, after the establishment of the Tokugawa shogunate, the Mogami were dispossessed, and a new  40,000 koku domain, Kaminoyama Domain was created. Thereafter the castle and Kaminoyama Domain passed through a number of daimyō clans, often for only a generation or two, and its revenues were often reduced. Under the Toki clan, a donjon was built, but it was destroyed when the clan was transferred elsewhere in 1692. In 1697, the castle came under the control of the Fujii branch of the Matsudaira clan, which continued to rule over Kaminoyama Domain until the Meiji restoration.

With the Abolition of the han system in 1871, Kaminoyama Domain became Kaminoyama Prefecture, and in 1872 the castle grounds were sold to the government and turned into a park.

In 1982, on the site of the second bailey, a faux reconstruction of a “typical” Edo period donjon was constructed out of concrete to serve as a tourist attraction and as a local history museum. It contains a local history museum.

Literature

External links
 Kaminoyama Castle Jcastle Profile
Japan Castle Explorer
 Official home page

Notes

Castles in Yamagata Prefecture
Museums in Yamagata Prefecture
History museums in Japan
Kaminoyama, Yamagata